The Astana Gede inscriptions, also known as Kawali inscriptions, refers to six inscriptions discovered in Kabuyutan Kawali area, Ciamis Regency, West Java; the main inscription (Kawali I) bears the longest scripts. All of the inscriptions were written in Old Sundanese language and in Old Sundanese script. Although the inscription does not contain chandrasangkala (chronogram), the inscription was thought to be originated from the second half of the 14th century, based on the name of the king mentioned in this inscription.

The inscription was compared to other historical sources, such as Carita Parahyangan and Pustaka Rajya Rajya i Bhumi Nusantara manuscripts, and it was concluded that the Kawali I inscription was meant as a sakakala or commemoration  monument to honor the greatness of King Niskala Wastu Kancana, ruler of Sunda ruled from his capital in Kawali. Niskala Wastu Kancana was the sole surviving heir of King Linggabuana, and also the younger brother of Princess Dyah Pitaloka Citraresmi; both died in Bubat Majapahit in 1357.

Content

Original text 
Front:
 nihan tapa kawa-
 li nu sang hyang mulia tapa bha-
 gya parĕbu raja wastu
 mangadĕg di kuta ka-
 wali nu mahayuna kadatuan
 sura wisesa nu marigi sa-
 kuliling dayĕh. nu najur sakala 
 desa aja manu panderi pakĕna
 gawe ring hayu pakĕn hebel ja
 ya dina buana

Text on the side, bold:
 hayua diponah-ponah
 hayua dicawuh-cawuh
 inya neker inya angger
 inya ninycak inya rempag

Translation 
Front:
This is the trace (in) Kawali (of) his majesty Prabu Raja Wastu (which) erected the defense (ruled in) Kawali city, (who has) renovated Surawisesa palace, constructed the defensive moats surrounding the capital city, (he who) gave prosperity throughout the villages. For those who will visit (this place), they better to perform safety (be cautious) as the foundation for glorious life in the world.

Text on the side, bold:
Do not destroy!
Do not abuse!
Those who honor (it), will remain.
Those who step over (it), will fall.

References 
 J. G. de Casparis. Indonesian Paleography, 1975.
 Yoseph Iskandar. Sejarah Jawa Barat: yuganing rajakawasa. Geger Sunten, Bandung.
 Richadiana Kartakusuma. 2005. Situs Kawali: ajaran Sunda dalam tradisi mégalitik? dalam Sundalana 4: 41-64. Pusat Studi Sunda, Bandung.

See also 
 Sanghyang Tapak inscription

Sundanese inscriptions in Indonesia
14th-century inscriptions
Sunda Kingdom